Sir Walter Clarke Buchanan (20 June 1838 – 19 July 1924) was a New Zealand politician who became a member of the Reform Party that formed in 1909. Despite never being appointed as a minister, he was an influential politician and a strong advocate for farming interests.

Early life
Buchanan was born in 1838 in Kilmodan, Argyllshire, Scotland. He was the son of the farmer Donald McChananich and of his wife Janet Clarke. He was baptised under McChananich, the Gaelic version of Buchanan. He attended Greenock Academy, and moved to Australia at the age of 18, where he became a farmer. Around 1863 he moved to New Zealand.

Political career

Buchanan entered politics in 1881, representing first Wairarapa South from 1881 to 1887, and then Wairarapa from 1887 to 1899, 1902 to 1905 and 1908 to 1914. He was in Parliament for much of the next 33 years, losing three elections.

He lost Wairarapa to J. T. Marryat Hornsby, the frequent Liberal Party candidate for the electorate, in 1899, won it back in 1902, lost it in 1905 and won it back in 1908. He finally lost the seat to Hornsby in 1914.

In the House, he was a staunch conservative voice, and a diehard opponent of the Liberal government of Richard Seddon.

Buchanan was knighted in 1913 and appointed to the Legislative Council in 1915, where he served until his death in 1924. Despite his long experience in politics, he was never appointed a Minister (partly because the Liberal Party was in power as from 1891 to 1914). Buchanan was appointed honorary colonel of the 17th (Ruahine) Regiment in 1916.

Death
Buchanan died on 19 July 1924 of heart failure following a car crash. He had never married. He was buried at Clareville Cemetery, Carterton.

Notes

References

|-

New Zealand people of Scottish descent
Members of the New Zealand House of Representatives
Members of the New Zealand Legislative Council
New Zealand Knights Bachelor
New Zealand farmers
Reform Party (New Zealand) MPs
1838 births
1924 deaths
People educated at Greenock Academy
New Zealand MPs for North Island electorates
Burials at Clareville Cemetery
Unsuccessful candidates in the 1899 New Zealand general election
Unsuccessful candidates in the 1905 New Zealand general election
Unsuccessful candidates in the 1914 New Zealand general election
19th-century New Zealand politicians
New Zealand politicians awarded knighthoods